The year 550 BC was a year of the pre-Julian Roman calendar. In the Roman Empire, it was known as year 204 Ab urbe condita. The denomination 550 BC for this year has been used since the early medieval period, when the Anno Domini calendar era became the prevalent method in Europe for naming years.

Events
 Greek colonization ends (approximate date).
 Cyrus II the Great overthrows Astyages of the Medes, establishing the Achaemenid Empire.
 Mago I begins his rule of Carthage and founds the Magonid dynasty.
 The Kingdom of Colchis is established.
 Abdera is destroyed by the Thracians.
 The Temple of Artemis is completed in Ephesus.
 The Temple of Hera I is built in what is now Paestum, Italy (approximate date).
 Siddhartha Gautama founds Buddhism in Northern India after achieving enlightenment after six years of practicing penance and meditation.

Births
Aristodemus of Cumae, tyrant of Cumae
Hecataeus of Miletus,  early Greek historian
Miltiades, renowned Olympic chariot-racer
Epicharmus, Greek poet

Deaths
Arcesilaus II of Cyrene, the fourth Greek Cyrenaean King and a member of the Battiad dynasty; he was strangled by Learchus

References